Vasily Andreyevich Nezabitovsky (1824 — 1883)  was a jurist, born in Radomyshl in the Kiev Governorate of the Russian Empire (present-day Ukraine). He graduated from Kiev University of St. Vladimir.  In 1853, Nezabitovsky transferred to the faculty of international law at Kiev University.

Contributions
Nezabitovsky is best known for his study of international law and his conception of a global law versus an international law, in the sense of law between nations.  Global law   or  general / omnisocial law  meant to protect an individual against allegiance to a given government or state.  Omnisocial law was thus one of the first manifestations of international human rights law.  Nezabitovsky's saw international law  as merely the protection of state's rights vis a vis  other states.  Omnisocial law was meant to act as a limit on international law.

References
The Teachings of Publicists on International Property (Kiev, 1862).

1824 births
1883 deaths
People from Zhytomyr Oblast
People from Radomyslsky Uyezd
Ukrainian jurists
International law scholars
Legal history of Russia
Taras Shevchenko National University of Kyiv alumni
Recipients of the Order of St. Vladimir, 3rd class
Recipients of the Order of St. Anna, 1st class
Recipients of the Order of St. Anna, 2nd class
Recipients of the Order of Saint Stanislaus (Russian), 1st class